Great Blunders Of World War II is a documentary series looking at some of the worst errors of World War II that affected the course of history. They are the decisions that have gone down in infamy, the battles determined not by bravery and brilliance but by incompetence and arrogance.

Episode list
The German Blunder at Dunkirk
Hitler's Declaration of War on the US
The Pilot Who Bombed London
Blunders of Hitler's Luftwaffe
A Bridge Too Far
The Battle of the Bulge
Japan's Mistakes at Midway
The Failure of the Kamikaze
Death at Stalingrad
Operation Sea Lion
The Bomb Plot to Kill Hitler
The Scattering of Convoy PQ 17

References

History (American TV channel) original programming
Documentary television series about World War II